Leonard Fielding Nalder   (1888–1958) was a British colonial administrator who was Governor in turn of Fung Province (1927–1930) and Mongalla province (1930–1936) in the Anglo-Egyptian Sudan.

Fielding was born in 1888 and educated at Rugby School and Corpus Christi College, Oxford. He joined the Sudan Political Service and was posted to Khartoum in 1912, then to the Red Sea Province from 1913 to 1917. He was temporarily transferred to serve in Mesopotamia and Iraq between 1917 and 1922. Between 1923 and 1926 he served in Kordofan and Khartoum. In 1927 he was a member of the Turko-Iraq Frontier Delimitation Commission. In 1927 he was appointed Governor of Fung Province, and in 1930 Governor of Mongalla province, serving in this position until his retirement in 1936.

References

1888 births
1958 deaths
British colonial governors and administrators in Africa
People educated at Rugby School
Alumni of Corpus Christi College, Oxford
Anglo-Egyptian Sudan people
Turkish people of British descent
Turkish people of Egyptian descent
Egyptian people of English descent
Sudan Political Service officers